Panarwa was a thikana of Solanki Rajputs, in the former Mewar State in present-day Rajasthan, India. It was founded .

History
Descendants of Solanki Kings of Patan spread over Rajasthan and Gujarat. One branch moved to Sirohi, from which Akshayraj Solanki, who was the grandson of Bhoja Solanki of Lach, entered Bhomat, killed Jeevraj Yadav, and established Panarwa as his principal seat in 1478 AD.
Bhil Gametis of this region entered into the service of Akhairaj.

In 16th century, Rawat Harpal Solanki, a descendant of Akshayraj and chief of Panarwa provided help to Maharana Udai Singh when he entered into Bhomat hills and Maharana Udai Singh granted him the title of Rana. From then on, Thakur of Panarwa were called Rana.

Rana Harpal's second son, Nahar Singh, captured Ogna and established Thikana of Oghna.

Rana Duda succeeded Rana Harpal, as Rana of Panarwa, but died shortly and then his son, Rana Punja (Rana Poonja) became the Rana of Panarwa.
Rana Punja is known for his role in struggle of Maharana Pratap against Mughals.

Punja's descendant Rana Chandrabhan also provided help to  Maharana Raj Singh during his war against Aurangzeb.

Judicial powers
In 1932, Mohabbat Singh Solanki, Rana of Panarwa was granted second class Judicial powers, which empowered it to issue sentencing up to one year and fine up to 300 rupees.
In 1945, Panarwa was granted first class Judicial Powers.

Revenue
Capital of Panarwa Thikana was Manpur. 
It consisted of 101 villages and its annual revenue was 15,637 rupees.

Rulers 

Rawat AkshayRaj Solanki
Rawat Raj Singh 
Rawat Mahipal
Rana Harpal 
Rana Duda 
Rana Punja 
Rana Rama 
Rana Chandrabhan 
Rana Surajmal
Rana Bhagwandas
Rana Jodh Singh
Rana Raghunath Singh
Rana Nathu Singh
Rana Guman Singh
Rana Kirat Singh
Rana Kesari Singh
Rana Udai Singh
Rana Pratap Singh
Rana Bhawani Singh
Rana Arjun Singh
Rana Mohabbat Singh
Rana Manohar Singh

Current head
The current Chief of Panarwa Royal family is Rana Manohar Singh Solanki.

References

 
 

Geography of Udaipur